The Paragon Banking Group PLC is one of the United Kingdom's largest providers of mortgages, savings accounts, and business finance. It is listed on the London Stock Exchange and is a constituent of the FTSE 250 Index.

History
The company was established in 1985 as the National Home Loans Corporation. It launched Homeloans Direct in 1995. In 1997 it changed its name to the Paragon Group of Companies. In 2003 it acquired Britannic Money.

In 2014, the Paragon Group of Companies PLC launched Paragon Bank which offers a range of internet-based savings accounts and a range of lending products.

In 2017, it changed its name to Paragon Banking Group PLC, as part of becoming a "fully integrated banking business".

In 2018, Paragon Banking Group completed a £48m takeover of residential lender Titlestone Property Finance.

Operations
The company is based in Solihull and offers lending to landlords and businesses and also offers savings accounts to consumers.

References

External links
 Official site

Companies based in the West Midlands (county)
Financial services companies established in 1985
Companies listed on the London Stock Exchange
1985 establishments in the United Kingdom